Ilia Shuke was a footballer and coach of the Albania national football team for a short spell in 1973, where he led the team to their first ever World Cup qualification win, a 1-0 defeat of Finland in October 1973.

Managerial career
His other two matches in charge of Albania were a World Cup qualification loss against East Germany, and a friendly draw against China.

He also was an assistant to national team coach Loro Boriçi in the 1960s.

References

Year of birth unknown
Year of death unknown
Association footballers not categorized by position
Albanian footballers
Albanian football managers
Albania national football team managers
FK Partizani Tirana managers
KF Skënderbeu Korçë managers